Cẩm Bình may refer to several places in Vietnam, including:

 Cẩm Bình, Quảng Ninh, a ward of Cẩm Phả
 Cẩm Bình, Thanh Hóa, a rural commune of Cẩm Thủy District
 Cẩm Bình, Hà Tĩnh, a rural commune of Cẩm Xuyên District
 Former Cẩm Bình District of Hải Hưng Province